Flight 508 may refer to:

 LANSA Flight 508, crashed in Peru in 1971. Sole survivor walked through jungle.
 L'Express Airlines Flight 508, crashed approaching Birmingham, Alabama airport in 1991

0508